Inaam-e-Mohabbat is a 2022 Pakistani soap television serial produced by Zeeshan Khan in collaboration with Syed Mukhtar Ahmed under his production banner "Gold Bridge Entertainment". The drama serial is written by Erum Wasi and Saima Wasi. It features Haroon Shahid, Nazish Jahangir and Sidra Niazi in leading roles.
 The serial is a love story between Mair (Haroon Shahid), a son of rich and influential businesswoman  Sabeen (Sakina Samo) and Anaya (Nazish Jahangir), a girl from a middle class family background.

Cast
Haroon Shahid as Mair
Nazish Jahangir as Anaya
Sidra Niazi as Munizay
Sakina Samo as Sabeena Samiullah Sehgal
Sajid Hassan as Adnan
Rashid Farooqui as Kareem
Fareeha Jabeen as Mumtaz
Raeed Muhammad Alam as Shahzar
Agha Talal as Rohan
Naveed Raza as Muneeb
Aiman Zaman Khan as Zuna
Zain Afzal as Aamir
Becks Khan as Savera
Ayesha Rajpoot as Faryal
Shehzad Malik as Hameed
Noshaba Javed as Ghazala
Humaira Affan as Zakiya
Adeel Abbas as Noor
Hoorain (child star)

Broadcast
The serial was released on 19 June 2022, airing episodes daily at 7:00 PM, preceding "Saaya (season 2)". It aired its last episode on 17 August 2022, followed by "Guddu".

References

External Links

2022 Pakistani television series debuts
2022 Pakistani television series endings
Geo TV original programming
Pakistani drama television series